Alberto Piccinini may refer to:
 Alberto Piccinini (footballer) (1923-1972), Italian footballer
 Alberto Piccinini (politician) (1942-2021), Argentine politician